Pejavara is a village located in the Mangalore taluk of Dakshina Kannada, formerly known as South Canara or South Kanara, district of Karnataka, India. It houses one of the eight ashta mathas established by Madhvacharya, the great Tattvavāda philosopher. It also houses a branch of the Krishnapura matha, another of the ashta mathas founded by Madhvacharya. Pejavara is very close to the Thokur railway station on the Mumbai-Mangalore Konkan railway route.

Pejavara Adhokshaja Mut has gained a great deal of fame throughout India and the world, for a great propagation of Madhwa's philosophy, and upholding the truth of Hari's supremacy.

See also
 Pejavara Guru Parampara

External links 
 
 vishveshavani.com
 udupipages.com
 konkanrailway.com

Localities in Mangalore
Villages in Dakshina Kannada district